Clempson is a surname. Notable people with the surname include:

Clem Clempson (born 1949), English rock guitarist
Frank Clempson (1930–1970), English footballer and manager